Select Cases in the K. B. in 22d, 23d, and 24th years of Charles I., with the names of the learned Counsel who argued the same is the title of a collection of nominate reports, by John Aleyn, of cases decided by the Court of King's Bench between approximately 1646 and 1649. For the purpose of citation, their name may be abbreviated to "Al". They are reprinted in volume 82 of the English Reports.

J. G. Marvin said:

References
Aleyn, J. Select Cases in the K. B. in 22d, 23d, and 24th years of Charles I., with the names of the learned Counsel who argued the same. Folio. London. 1681 or 1688.

Sets of reports reprinted in the English Reports
Court of King's Bench (England)